Feđa Dudić (born 1 February 1983) is a Bosnian professional football manager and former player.

Born in Sarajevo, Dudić played for both hometown clubs FK Sarajevo and Željezničar, as well as other clubs in Bosnia and Herzegovina, Croatia and Serbia. He won the Croatian 1. HNL with Zagreb in 2002, as well as the Bosnian Cup with Sarajevo in 2005. He was the Bosnian Premier League top goalscorer in the 2009–10 season while playing for Travnik.

Dudić started his managerial career at GOŠK Gabela in 2017, managing the club until 2018. He became manager of Velež Mostar in 2019, achieving success with them by qualifying the club to the 2021–22 UEFA Europa Conference League, their first European competition after 33 years. Dudić won the Bosnian Cup with Velež in 2022. Following his success with Velež, Dudić left the club to become manager of Sarajevo in June, where he worked until October 2022.

Playing career
Born in Sarajevo, SR Bosnia and Herzegovina, SFR Yugoslavia, Dudić started his career playing in the youth teams of Sarajevo, but still young, he moved to Croatia where he became part of the Zagreb championship winning squad in the 2001–02 season.

He would have a short loan spell with another 1. HNL side, TŠK Topolovac before returning to Bosnia where he would play for several clubs during the following seasons, namely Sloboda Tuzla, Brotnjo, Sarajevo, with whom he won the 2004–05 Bosnian Cup, Travnik and Željezničar. He also played with Karlovac in the 2. HNL during the 2005–06 season.

During the summer of 2010, and having become the 2009–10 Bosnian Premier League top goalscorer with 16 goals, Dudić came to Hajduk Split for a trial, however he ended up signing with another 1. HNL side, Varaždin, where he was a part of the team that finished as a Croatian Cup runner-up in the 2010–11 cup season.

In the summer of 2011, Dudić moved back to Bosnia, signing with newly promoted team GOŠK Gabela, but in the following winter break, newly promoted Serbian SuperLiga side Novi Pazar decided to reinforce their team with players from the Bosnian Premier League, bringing him alongside Admir Raščić.

After Novi Pazar, Dudić played for Slavija Sarajevo, Travnik again and Zvijezda Gradačac, before retiring in 2016 at the age of 33.

Managerial career

Early career
After retiring, Dudić became an assistant manager at Travnik in 2016, where he stayed until June 2017.

GOŠK Gabela
On 27 November 2017, Dudić was named new manager of the club that he played in before, GOŠK Gabela, after manager Slaven Musa resigned. With GOŠK, he finished 7th in the 2017–18 Bosnian Premier League season.

In the 2018–19 season, GOŠK started of well under the guidance of Dudić, but after a series of poor results, which culminated with a 0–0 draw against Čelik Zenica, on 26 September 2018, Dudić resigned from the position of manager of GOŠK, after almost a year of him being the manager.

Velež Mostar

2019–20 season
On 5 August 2019, Dudić became the new manager of Velež Mostar. In his first match as the club's manager, Velež tied 0–0 against Sloboda Tuzla away on 10 August 2019, winning their first point in the 2019–20 league season. His first win with Velež came on 17 August 2019, in a 1–0 home league win against Široki Brijeg. Dudić's first loss as Velež manager was a 2–1 away league loss against Sarajevo on 24 August 2019.

In his first ever Mostar derby, Dudić's Velež beat fierce city rivals Zrinjski Mostar 1–0 at home in a league match on 19 October 2019, marking that Velež's first Mostar derby win in over 5 years. He was also praised by Velež fans for his team's 0–2 away league win against Željezničar on 7 December 2019. Dudić's next big result came on 8 March 2020, when Velež beat Borac Banja Luka 2–1 at home in another league match.

2020–21 season
In the first game of the 2020–21 season on 1 August 2020, Velež handled a tough 3–0 loss against Željezničar, but in the second game, on 8 August, Dudić's team managed to beat city rivals Zrinjski for a second time in a row.

On 31 October 2020, Velež got defeated by Zrinjski in the Mostar derby, with Dudić taking the blame.

On 28 December 2020, he extended his contract with the club until June 2023.

During the 2020–21 season, Dudić managed to make a new record with Velež by not losing 16 league games in a row, following a Mostar derby draw against Zrinjski on 8 May 2021. At the end of the season, he made a great result with the club, finishing in 3rd place and qualifying Velež to the 2021–22 UEFA Europa Conference League, their first European competition after 33 years.

2021–22 season
Dudić's Velež opened the 2021–22 season with the Conference League qualifying phase, firstly eliminating semi-professional Northern Irish club Coleraine. In the second qualifying round, his team, surprisingly, eliminated Greek giants AEK Athens. However, in the third qualifying round, Velež was eliminated by Swedish side IF Elfsborg, thus putting an end to their European "fairytale".

Velež started off the domestic league season well, beating newly promoted side Posušje on 19 July 2021. After beating Posušje, Dudić's team went into a short, three-game winless run, but ended it with a win against Široki Brijeg on 22 August 2021. Two months later, following a new string of poor results, Dudić resigned as Velež's manager after a disappointing league loss against Radnik Bijeljina on 31 October. However, the next day, he changed his decision and stayed at the club.

On 19 May 2022, Dudić led Velež to win the first Bosnian Cup title in their history, after a penalty shoot-out, following a 0–0 draw against Sarajevo in the final.

Sarajevo
On 2 June 2022, Dudić signed a two-year contract with Sarajevo, with an option to stay at the club until at least 2025. In his first game in charge, Sarajevo defeated Borac Banja Luka on 24 July 2022.

After winning two more league games against Sloga Doboj and Posušje, on 10 August 2022, Dudić's side lost 5–1 to Tuzla City. It was Sarajevo's biggest ever Bosnian Premier League defeat in history. On 26 August, Sarajevo drew against Željezničar in Dudić's first Sarajevo derby as a manager.

On 19 October 2022, following a series of poor results, which culminated with a first round cup elimination by Čelik Zenica, Dudić resigned as manager, only four months after taking up the position.

Managerial statistics

Honours

Player
Zagreb 
1. HNL: 2001–02

Sarajevo 
Bosnian Cup: 2004–05

Travnik 
First League of FBiH: 2006–07

Individual
Bosnian Premier League Top Goalscorer: 2009–10 (16 goals)

Manager
Velež Mostar
Bosnian Cup: 2021–22

References

External links

1983 births
Living people
Footballers from Sarajevo
Association football forwards
Bosnia and Herzegovina footballers
NK Zagreb players
NK TŠK Topolovac players
FK Sloboda Tuzla players
NK Brotnjo players
FK Sarajevo players
NK Karlovac players
NK Travnik players
FK Željezničar Sarajevo players
NK Varaždin players
NK GOŠK Gabela players
FK Novi Pazar players
FK Slavija Sarajevo players
NK Zvijezda Gradačac players
Croatian Football League players
Premier League of Bosnia and Herzegovina players
First Football League (Croatia) players
Serbian SuperLiga players
First League of the Federation of Bosnia and Herzegovina players
Bosnia and Herzegovina expatriate footballers
Expatriate footballers in Croatia
Bosnia and Herzegovina expatriate sportspeople in Croatia
Expatriate footballers in Serbia
Bosnia and Herzegovina expatriate sportspeople in Serbia
Bosnia and Herzegovina football managers
NK GOŠK Gabela managers
FK Velež Mostar managers
FK Sarajevo managers
Premier League of Bosnia and Herzegovina managers